Seetpur is a city in Tehsil Alipur of Muzaffargarh District in south Punjab, Pakistan. In this city, there is a famous Tomb of Tahir Khan Nahar. Its architecture resembles that of the Multan Tombs, but it is smaller in size compared to them. The Government High School of Seetpur was established by the British during the British Raj. Agriculture is the mainstay of the area's economy.

There is also a mosque named Shahi masjid seetpur that was built in the 1880s and renewed in the 1900s.

References

Populated places in Muzaffargarh District